The Third European Political Community Summit is a planned meeting of the European Political Community to be held on 5 October 2023 at the Alhambra in Granada, Spain.

Preparation

The date and the venue for the summit was announced in February 2023.

An informal meeting of the European Council is also expected to take place the following day at the same venue.

Participants 
The summit is expected to be attended by the heads of state or government of the states participating in the European Political Community along with the President of the European Council and President of the European Commission.

See also

 European integration
 Pan-European identity
 Politics of Europe

References

European Political Community
Diplomatic conferences
2023 conferences
Foreign relations of the European Union
European integration
European Political Community
Pan-European organizations
2023 in Spain
21st-century diplomatic conferences (Europe)
2023 in international relations